Framwellgate Bridge is a mediaeval masonry arch bridge across the River Wear, in Durham, England. It is a Grade I listed building.

History
The bridge was built after 1400 to replace one built early in the 12th century for Ranulf Flambard, who was Bishop of Durham 1099–1128. Flambard's bridge seems to have had five or six arches. A record of a lawsuit in 1437 records that Flambard's bridge:

Until the replacement bridge was completed a ferry was substituted, the profit from which was shared between the Bishop of Durham and the Prior of Durham Cathedral Priory.

The current bridge is of two shallow arches, each with several reinforcing ribs. The early 16th-century antiquary John Leland recorded that there were three arches. A watercolour of Durham Cathedral painted by Thomas Girtin in 1799 shows a third arch, with a rounded shape characteristic of Norman architecture. Buildings at the central Durham end of the bridge may conceal the third arch, which may be a surviving part of Flambard's original 12th-century bridge.

Some sources indicate that both ends of the bridge were fortified by towers and gates, though others infer only a single gatehouse was built on the peninsula side of the river. The gateway and tower at the eastern end of the bridge were deemed an obstruction to traffic and demolished in 1760. A flood destroyed two houses at the end of the bridge in 1771. Early in the 19th century the bridge was widened on its upstream side. Of the reinforcing ribs under each arch, five belong to the 15th-century bridge and two to the 19th-century widening.

In 1318, Robert Neville, the "Peacock of the North", murdered his cousin, the Bishop's Steward, Sir Richard Fitzmarmaduke, at Framwellgate Bridge.

Until the building of Milburngate Bridge in 1969, Framwellgate Bridge was the main traffic route from the west through the centre of Durham. Today, the bridge is pedestrianised.

References

Sources

Bridges completed in the 15th century
Bridges across the River Wear
Bridges in County Durham
Buildings and structures in Durham, England
Grade I listed bridges
Grade I listed buildings in County Durham